Hardas is a village in Kargil district of the Indian union territory of Ladakh, close to the India–Pakistan border (LOC). The village is located 10 kilometres north of Kargil, the district headquarters, on the left of the Dras River.

Geography 
Hardas is on the left bank of the Dras River, shortly before its confluence with the Suru River. The village is laid out on a large alluvial plain formed by a mountain stream. The villagers had built a three-mile long aqueduct to channel the water from the steam to water the farms and gardens of the village, which was described with much admiration by Alexander Cunningham.

Closer to the confluence of Dras and Suru is the hamlet of Kharal, on a small alluvial plain inside the wide bend of the Dras River as it joins the Suru. During the British Raj period, there was a rest house at Kharal. There was also a bridge over the Dras River, called "Kharol bridge", which was a necessary part of the route from Kargil to Skardu as well as Kargil to Drass (and Kashmir beyond it).

The present highway between Srinagar and Kargil runs on the right bank of the Dras River. The road to Skardu continues to exist but breaks at the Line of Control just before the Gangam village of Baltistan.

Demographics
According to the 2011 census of India, Hardas has 233 households. The literacy rate of Hardas was 76.24%. In Hardas, Male literacy stands at 87.86% while the female literacy rate was 64.25%.

Transport
Hardas is well-connected by road to other places in Ladakh and India by the Srinagar-Leh Highway or the NH 1.

The nearest major railway stations to Hardas is the Srinagar railway station located at a distance of 223 kilometres.

The nearest airport is at Kargil located at a distance of 18 kilometres but it is currently not operational. The next nearest major airports are Srinagar International Airport and Leh Airport located at a distance of 219 kilometres and 225 kilometres.

Maps

See also
Hunderman

Notes

References

Bibliography 
 
 
 
 

Villages in Kargil tehsil